The 2019–20 St. John's Red Storm men's basketball team represented St. John's University during the 2019–20 NCAA Division I men's basketball season. They were coached by Mike Anderson, in his first year at the school, and  played their home games at Carnesecca Arena and Madison Square Garden as members of the Big East Conference. They finished the season 17–15, 5–13 in Big East play to finish in a tie for eighth place. As the No. 9 seed in the Big East tournament, they defeated Georgetown in the first round before having their quarterfinal game against Creighton canceled at halftime due to the ongoing coronavirus pandemic.

Previous season
The Red Storm finished the 2018–19 season with a record of 21–13, 8–10 in Big East play to finish in seventh place in conference. They defeated DePaul in the first round of the Big East tournament before losing to Marquette in the quarterfinals. They received an at-large bid to the NCAA tournament where they lost in the first four to Arizona State.

Offseason

Departures

Incoming transfers

2019 recruiting class

2020 Recruiting class

Roster

Schedule and results

|-
!colspan=9 style=| Exhibition

|-
!colspan=9 style=| Regular season

|-
!colspan=9 style=| Big East regular season

|-
!colspan=9 style=|Big East tournament

References

St. John's
St. John's Red Storm men's basketball seasons
Saint John's